Minnesota State Highway 263 (MN 263) is a  highway in southwest Minnesota, which runs from its intersection with Martin County State-Aid Highway 8 in Ceylon and continues north to its northern terminus at its interchange with Interstate 90 near Welcome, nine miles west of Fairmont.

Route description
Highway 263 serves as a north–south connector route in southwest Minnesota between Ceylon and Interstate 90 near Welcome.

Highway 263 is also known as Main Street in Ceylon.  The route follows Guide Street in Welcome.

History
Highway 263 was authorized on July 1, 1949.

The route was paved in 1951.

The 2021 Minnesota Legislature authorized removal of the route, to become effective when a turnback agreement is reached with Martin County.

Major intersections

References

External links

Highway 263 at the Unofficial Minnesota Highways Page

263
Transportation in Martin County, Minnesota